Jürgen Augustinowitz (born 10 June 1964) is a German politician and former member of the German Bundestag.

Life 
After secondary modern school he attended commercial school and then trained as a bank clerk. In 1985/86, he did his military service. After the German Armed Forces, he worked as a banker and finally worked in a corporate client department in a branch of Deutsche Bank AG in Lippstadt.

He is catholic and married. He has two sons.

From 20 December 1990 to 26 October 1998, he was a member of the German Bundestag (CDU) twice for the constituency of Soest (North Rhine-Westphalia).

References

1964 births
Living people
Members of the Bundestag for North Rhine-Westphalia
Members of the Bundestag 1994–1998
Members of the Bundestag 1990–1994
Members of the Bundestag for the Christian Democratic Union of Germany